Athlete was the debut release by British rock band Athlete. It was released in the UK as an EP on March 4, 2002. The EP features the original versions of "Westside" and "Dungeness", which were soon to appear on the band's debut album.

Track listing

References

External links

2002 debut EPs
Athlete (band) albums
Albums produced by Victor Van Vugt